Perkins Glacier is a broad, low gradient glacier 8 nautical miles (15 km) south-southeast of Cape Burks on the coast of Marie Byrd Land. It drains west from McDonald Heights into the east side of Hull Bay. Mapped by United States Geological Survey (USGS) from surveys and U.S. Navy air photos, 1959–65. Named by Advisory Committee on Antarctic Names (US-ACAN) for Earle B. Perkins, biologist with the Byrd Antarctic Expedition, 1933–35.

Glaciers of Marie Byrd Land